Jane E. Gurnett (born 12 March 1957, Dorset) is an English actress known for her roles in British TV series Casualty (1994–1996), Dangerfield (1998–1999) and the second incarnation of Crossroads (2001–2003). She moved to Warwick School to teach drama. In early 2018, she became part-time to set up an organisation designed to help teachers and parents work with children who have autism.

Selected credits
The Rainbow (1988) as Anna Brangwen
Drowning By Numbers (1988) as Nancy
Casualty (1994–1996) as Rachel Longworth
Dangerfield (1998–1999) as DI Gillian Kramer
Real Women (1998–1999) as Chris
Crossroads (2001–2003) as Kate Russell
Doctors (2022) as Verity Foster

References

External links
 

1957 births
Living people
English soap opera actresses
English television actresses
English musical theatre actresses
English film actresses
20th-century English actresses
21st-century English actresses
English stage actresses
Warwickshire College
Schoolteachers from Dorset
People educated at the Arts Educational Schools